Tonya Paulsson (born 28 August 2003) is a Swedish artistic gymnast.  She is the 2019 and 2020 Swedish National Champion and she represented Sweden at the 2018 Youth Olympics where she was part of the Mixed NOC team who won bronze in the mixed multi-discipline team competition.

Early life 
Paulsson was born in Malmö in 2003.  She began gymnastics in 2010.

Gymnastics career

Junior

2016
Paulsson competed at the Unni & Haralds Trophy in Oslo where she finished fourth in the all-around but won gold on uneven bars.  The following month Paulsson competed at the Nordic Championships where she was limited to only competing on the uneven bars due to a knee injury.  Despite the injury she helped Sweden finish first in the junior division.  She next competed at the Swedish National Championships.  She once again only competed on uneven bars but managed to finish first amongst the juniors.

2017
Paulsson competed at a team selection competition for the 2017 Junior Nordic Championships where she placed first in the all-around ahead of Jessica Castles and she also recorded the highest scores on vault and uneven bars.  At the Junior Nordic Championships Paulsson helped Sweden finish in third place.  Individually she finished sixteenth in the all-around but won gold on uneven bars.  In June she competed at the Flanders International Team Challenge where she helped Sweden finish ninth.

In late June Paulsson competed at the Swedish National Championships where she won silver in the all-around behind Ida Staafgård, silver on vault behind Castles, gold on uneven bars, bronze on balance beam behind Staafgård and Castles, and fourth on floor exercise.   In November Paulsson competed at the Swedish Cup where she finished first amongst the juniors.  During event finals she finished second on vault, first on uneven bars, third on balance beam, and fifth on floor exercise.  She ended the season competing at the Top Gym Tournament where she finished tenth in the team competition, seventeenth in the all-around, thirteenth on vault, sixth on uneven bars.

2018
Paulsson competed at the Youth Olympic Qualifier where she finished in twelfth place and qualified Sweden for a spot at the 2018 Summer Youth Olympics. She next competed at the Nordic Championships where she helped Sweden finish second behind Norway.  Individually she won silver in the all-around behind Mari Kanter of Norway, gold on uneven bars, and bronze on floor exercise.  She finished sixth on balance beam.  She next competed at the Swedish National Championships where she placed first in the all-around, on uneven bars, on balance beam, and on floor exercise.  Paulsson competed at the European Championships but failed to qualify for any event finals.  Paulsson was selected to represent Sweden at the 2018 Youth Olympics held in Buenos Aires.  While there she qualified for the all-around and uneven bars finals.  During the all-around final she placed seventh.  During the uneven bars final she once again placed seventh.

Senior

2019
Paulsson turned senior in 2019.  She competed at the Swedish National Championships where she won gold in all-around and silver on uneven bars behind Jonna Adlerteg.  She next competed at the Heerenveen Friendly where she finished seventeenth in the all-around.  She ended the season competing at the Mälar Cup where she finished second behind Alva Eriksson in the all-around and on floor exercise.  Additionally she tied for second with Eriksson on uneven bars behind Iida Haapala.  She finished first on balance beam.

2020
In October Paulsson competed at the Swedish National Championships where she was able to retain her national title from the previous year.  Additionally she won gold on balance beam and floor exercise and won silver on uneven bars behind Jonna Adlerteg.

2021
Paulsson competed at the European Championships where she qualified to the all-around final; she placed 14th.  In September Paulsson was selected to compete at the World Championships alongside Nathalie Westlund and Jennifer Williams.

Competitive history

References

External links
 

2003 births
Living people
Swedish female artistic gymnasts
Sportspeople from Malmö
Gymnasts at the 2018 Summer Youth Olympics
21st-century Swedish women